In mathematical analysis, Wiener's tauberian theorem is any of several related results proved by Norbert Wiener in 1932.

Gelfand reformulated Wiener's theorem in terms of commutative C*-algebras, when it states that the spectrum of the L1 group ring L1(R) of the group R of real numbers is the dual group of R. A similar result is true when R is replaced by any locally compact abelian group.

The condition in 

Let  be an integrable function. The span of translations  =  is dense in  if and only if the Fourier transform of  has no real zeros.

Tauberian reformulation

The following statement is equivalent to the previous result, and explains why Wiener's result is a Tauberian theorem:

Then the convolution  tends to zero at infinity for any .

More generally, if

 

for some  the Fourier transform of which has no real zeros, then also

 

for any .

Discrete version

has no real zeros. The following statements are equivalent version of this result:

 Suppose the Fourier transform of  has no real zeros, and for some bounded sequence  the convolution  tends to zero at infinity. Then  also tends to zero at infinity for any .
 Let  be a function on the unit circle with absolutely convergent Fourier series. Then  has absolutely convergent Fourier series if and only if  has no zeros.

 showed that this is equivalent to the following property of the Wiener algebra , which he proved using the theory of Banach algebras, thereby giving a new proof of Wiener's result:

The condition in 

Let  be a square-integrable function. The span of translations  =  is dense in  if and only if the real zeros of the Fourier transform of  form a set of zero Lebesgue measure.

has zero Lebesgue measure.

Notes

References

External links

Real analysis
Harmonic analysis
Tauberian theorems